Pace Pakistan (Pace Khareedari Markaz) is a Pakistani shopping malls operator based in Lahore, Punjab, Pakistan.

History
Pace Pakistan was founded in 1992 by Salman Taseer as part of First Capital Group.

In 1995, Pace opened their first shopping mall in Gulberg, Lahore.

In 2005, Pace expanded their operations and Pace Model Town Link Road was inaugurated. Two years later, another shopping mall was opened on M.M. Alam Road, Lahore.

Pace Woodlands Pvt. Limited, Pace Supermall Pvt. Limited and Pace shopping malls (Lahore, Gujranwala and Gujrat) are Pace's subsidiaries and associated companies. Pace Woodlands Housing Scheme, Bedian Road, Lahore, Pace Circle, Peacock Valley Hotel and Resort and Pace Tower, T-27 are also projects of pace Pakistan. Pace Woodlands is a private limited company and a subsidiary of Pace with 52% shareholding. The rest shares are held by Pace Barka properties limited, one of the associated companies. Pace Supermall is another private limited company, and a subsidiary of Pace with its 69% shareholding. Pace Supermall involved in acquiring by purchase or otherwise land and plots and to sell or construct.

The Mall Cathces had burned down several times over the past ten years. Finally, on March 14, 2022, it erupted in flames and turned to ashes once more. According to the authorities, this time the fire was caused by management negligence and a lack of fire safety systems.

The Sellers and Buyers have moved to others nearby new Constructed malls, Some of them are still Struggling to survive.

From 14March,2022 the mall is Closed and Declared not safe.

References 

Retailing in Lahore
Shopping malls in Pakistan
1992 establishments in Pakistan
Companies listed on the Pakistan Stock Exchange